Ford v Ferrari (titled Le Mans '66 in some European countries) is a 2019 American sports drama film directed by James Mangold and written by Jez Butterworth, John-Henry Butterworth, and Jason Keller. It stars Matt Damon and Christian Bale, with Jon Bernthal, Caitríona Balfe, Tracy Letts, Josh Lucas, Noah Jupe, Remo Girone, and Ray McKinnon in supporting roles. The plot follows a determined team of American and British engineers and designers, led by automotive designer Carroll Shelby and his British driver, Ken Miles, who are hired by Henry Ford II and Lee Iacocca to build a race car to defeat the perennially dominant Italian racing team Scuderia Ferrari at the 1966 24 Hours of Le Mans race in France.

Ford v Ferrari had its world premiere at the Telluride Film Festival on August 30, 2019, and was theatrically released in the United States on November 15, 2019, by 20th Century Fox. The film grossed $225 million worldwide and received acclaim from critics, who lauded the performances (particularly Bale and Damon), Mangold's direction, the editing, the sound design and the racing sequences.

It was chosen by the National Board of Review as one of the ten best films of the year, and at the 92nd Academy Awards received four nominations, including Best Picture, and won Best Film Editing and Best Sound Editing. Bale also received nominations for the Golden Globe Award for Best Actor – Drama and the Screen Actors Guild Award for Outstanding Performance by a Male Actor in a Leading Role.

Plot

In 1963, Ford Motor Company Vice President Lee Iacocca proposes to Henry Ford II to boost their car sales by purchasing Italian car manufacturer Ferrari, dominant in the 24 Hours of Le Mans. Owner Enzo Ferrari uses Ford's offer to secure a deal with Fiat that allows him to retain ownership of the firm's racing team, Scuderia Ferrari. He insults Ford II and the whole Ford Motor Company. Ford orders his racing division to build a car to defeat Ferrari at Le Mans. Iacocca hires Shelby American owner Carroll Shelby, a retired driver who won Le Mans in 1959. Shelby enlists his friend Ken Miles, a hot-tempered British racer and mechanical engineer.

Shelby and Miles develop the UK-built Ford GT40 Mk I prototype at Los Angeles International Airport. At the launch of the new Ford Mustang, Miles gives a witheringly rude appraisal of it to Ford Senior Vice President Leo Beebe due to him refusing to let Miles' son, Peter, touch the car, sparking a rivalry between them. Beebe campaigns against sending Miles to the 1965 24 Hours of Le Mans as a public relations liability. Shelby reluctantly excludes Miles and sends Phil Hill and Bruce McLaren to Le Mans. None of the Fords finish.

When Ford demands why he should not sack Shelby, Shelby explains that despite the GT40's reliability problems, it instilled fear in Enzo Ferrari by reaching 218 mph (350.8 km/h), on the Mulsanne Straight before breaking down. He says a racing car cannot be designed by committee. Ford tells him to continue the project and report directly to him. During testing of the GT40 Mk II, the recurrent problem of brake fade causes a crash and fire. The team realizes the rules permit replacing the whole brake assembly during the race.

In 1966, Beebe takes over the racing division. When he and Ford arrive to inspect the program, Shelby locks Beebe in his office and gives Ford a ride in the GT40. Shelby makes a deal with Ford: if Miles wins the 24 Hours of Daytona then he will race at Le Mans. If not, Ford will take full ownership of Shelby American. At Daytona, Beebe enters a second GT40 supported by a NASCAR team with quicker pit stops. Shelby clears Miles to push his car beyond the 7,000 RPM redline, and he wins.

At the 1966 24 Hours of Le Mans, Miles struggles with a faulty door during the first lap. The pit crew fixes it and Miles sets lap records catching the Ferraris.  The GT40 suffers brake fade while dicing with the prototype 330 P3 Ferrari of Lorenzo Bandini, so Miles limps into the pits for replacement of the entire braking system. Ferrari protests but Shelby assures race officials it is legal.

Miles and Bandini duel on the Mulsanne Straight until the Ferrari engine blows. With Fords in the top three positions, Beebe orders Shelby to have Miles slow down for the other Fords to catch him and give the press a three-car photo finish. Shelby tells Miles what Beebe wants but says it is Miles' call. Miles initially continues to set new lap records, but decides to comply on the final lap.

McLaren is declared the winner as, having started behind Miles, his car travelled further overall. Miles is placed second. Shelby accuses Beebe of deliberately costing Miles the win, but an unusually sanguine Miles lets it pass, saying to Shelby "you promised me the drive, not the win". From his vantage point Enzo Ferrari tips his hat to Miles on the track. As they walk off together, Miles tells Shelby they will win Le Mans next time.

Two months later, during testing at Riverside International Raceway, a mechanical failure in the J-car kills Miles in a crash. Six months later, Shelby parks outside Miles' widow Mollie's house and hesitates. Miles' son Peter arrives and the two talk about Miles. Shelby gives Peter a wrench that Miles once threw at him in anger.

Epilogue text says Ford continued its Le Mans winning streak in 1967, 1968, and 1969, and Miles was posthumously inducted into the Motorsports Hall of Fame of America in 2001.

Cast 
 Matt Damon as Carroll Shelby, American former race car driver, automotive designer, and builder
 Christian Bale as Ken Miles, British race car driver
 Jon Bernthal as Lee Iacocca, vice president of Ford
 Caitríona Balfe as Mollie Miles, Miles's wife
 Tracy Letts as Henry Ford II, CEO of Ford 
 Josh Lucas as Leo Beebe, vice president of Ford
 Noah Jupe as Peter Miles, Miles's son
 Remo Girone as Enzo Ferrari, founder of Ferrari
 Ray McKinnon as Phil Remington
 JJ Feild as Roy Lunn
 Jack McMullen as Charlie Agapiou
 Corrado Invernizzi as Franco Gozzi
 Tanner Foust as Ronnie Bucknum
 Brent Pontin as Chris Amon
 Benjamin Rigby as Bruce McLaren
 Francesco Bauco as Lorenzo Bandini
 Joe Williamson as Donald N. Frey
 Ian Harding as Ford Executive - Ian
 Christopher Darga as John Holman
 Jonathan LaPaglia as Eddie 
 Ben Collins as Denny Hulme
Alex Gurney as Dan Gurney
Marisa Petroro as Cristina Ford

Production 
A film based on the rivalry between Ford and Ferrari for the dominance at the Le Mans endurance race had long been in works at 20th Century Fox. Initially, it was going to star Tom Cruise, Brad Pitt, and Mason Caserta from an original screenplay titled Go Like Hell, by Jason Keller, the name being taken from the book, Go Like Hell: Ford, Ferrari, and Their Battle for Speed and Glory at Le Mans by A.J. Baime. The project fell apart, however, after writers Jez Butterworth and John-Henry Butterworth drafted a script and Joseph Kosinski was brought on to direct, due to the budget being too high.

On February 5, 2018, it was announced that James Mangold had been brought on board to direct the film based on the previous script by Keller and the Butterworths. Later, Caitríona Balfe, Jon Bernthal, and Noah Jupe joined the cast alongside Christian Bale and Matt Damon in the lead roles. In July 2018, Jack McMullen was cast in the film to play one of Miles's key British mechanics, and Tracy Letts also joined to play Henry Ford II, along with Joe Williamson. In August 2018, JJ Feild was cast in the film to play the automotive engineer Roy Lunn, the head of Ford Advanced vehicles in England and the right-hand man to Henry Ford II. Mangold approached Harrison Ford for a part in the film. Composer Marco Beltrami confirmed in an interview that he would be scoring the film, Beltrami having previously worked with Mangold on 3:10 to Yuma, The Wolverine and Logan.

Filming began on July 30, 2018, and lasted for 67 days, taking place in California; New Orleans, Louisiana; Atlanta; Savannah; and Statesboro, Georgia, as well as Le Mans, France. Race scenes that appear in the film as Daytona were filmed at Auto Club Speedway in Fontana; many other race scenes were filmed at a Honda test track in Mojave Valley (doubling for the Willow Springs Raceway) and at the Porsche Experience in Carson (for the Dearborn test track). A few scenes were filmed at tracks and roadways in Georgia such as Hwy 46 in Statesboro, Georgia. The Le Mans grandstands, pits, and garages were replicated at the Agua Dulce Airpark in Agua Dulce. The hangar area where the cars were developed (originally at LAX) was filmed at Ontario International Airport in Ontario, California.

Music

Release
Ford v Ferrari premiered at the Telluride Film Festival on August 30, 2019, and screened at the Toronto International Film Festival on September 9, 2019. It was subsequently released in the United States on November 15 by 20th Century Fox in 2D, IMAX, and Dolby Cinema formats. It was previously scheduled to be released on June 28.

The first trailer for the film debuted on June 2, 2019, during Game 2 of the 2019 NBA Finals.

Home media
The film was released on digital format by 20th Century Fox Home Entertainment on January 28, 2020, and on 4K Ultra HD Blu-ray and DVD on February 11, 2020.

Reception

Box office
Ford v Ferrari grossed $117.6 million in the United States and Canada, and $107.9 million in other territories, for a worldwide total of $225.5 million.

In the United States and Canada, the film was released alongside Charlie's Angels and The Good Liar, and was projected to gross $23–30 million from 3,528 theaters in its opening weekend. It made $10.9 million on its first day, including $2.1 million from Thursday night previews. It went on to debut to $31.5 million, topping the box office. In its second weekend the film dropped 50% to $15.7 million, finishing second behind newcomer Frozen II, and then made $13.2 million in its third weekend (including $19 million over the five-day Thanksgiving frame), finishing third. It continued to hold well in the following weeks, making $6.7 million and $4.1 million in its fourth and fifth weekends.

Critical response
The website's critics consensus reads, "Ford v Ferrari delivers all the polished auto action audiences will expect – and balances it with enough gripping human drama to satisfy non-racing enthusiasts." Metacritic assigned the film a weighted average score of 81 out of 100, based on 47 critics, indicating "universal acclaim." Audiences polled by CinemaScore gave the film a rare grade of "A+," while those at PostTrak gave it an overall positive score of 87% (with an average 4.5 out of 5 stars), with 68% saying they would definitely recommend it.

Mick LaSalle of San Francisco Chronicle gave the film a 4 out of 4 stars, saying that it "is what it promises to be, a blast from the past" and writing: "Ford v Ferrari could have just been a sports story, dramatizing an interesting chapter in racing, and it would have been fine. But in showing Ford and his minions' constant interference in the dedicated work of Miles and Shelby, this James Mangold film becomes a tale of souls battling the soulless." Eric Kohn of Indiewire gave the film a "B", saying that "Ford v Ferrari excels at evoking the sheer thrill of the race—'a body moving through space and time', as one character says—and it's compelling enough in those moments to make the case that nothing beats the thrill of competition." Varietys Peter DeBruge praised the racing sequences and the performances of Bale and Damon, writing: "The best sports movies aren't so much about the sport as they are the personalities, and these two go big with their performances."

Accolades

References

External links

 
 
 Official screenplay

2019 films
2019 action drama films
2010s English-language films
2010s sports drama films
24 Hours of Le Mans
American action drama films
American auto racing films
American biographical drama films
American buddy drama films
American business films
American sports drama films
BAFTA winners (films)
Biographical films about businesspeople
Chernin Entertainment films
Ferrari
Films about automobiles
Films directed by James Mangold
Films produced by Peter Chernin
Films produced by James Mangold
Films scored by Marco Beltrami
Films set in 1959
Films set in 1963
Films set in 1964
Films set in 1965
Films set in 1966
Films set in California
Films set in Detroit
Films set in Florida
Films set in France
Films set in Los Angeles
Films set in Italy
Films shot in Atlanta
Films shot in California
Films shot in France
Films shot in New Orleans
Films shot in Savannah, Georgia
Films that won the Best Sound Editing Academy Award
Films whose editor won the Best Film Editing Academy Award
Films with screenplays by Jez Butterworth
Ford Motor Company
20th Century Fox films
TSG Entertainment films
IMAX films
Enzo Ferrari
2010s American films
English-language sports drama films